The Consumer Packaging and Labelling Act is a Canadian regulatory statute, which has seen many amendments since it was originally passed in 1970. It governs the packaging, labelling, sale, importation and advertising of prepackaged and certain other products.

It requires that prepackaged consumer products bear accurate and meaningful labelling information to help consumers make informed purchasing decisions. The Act prohibits the making of false or misleading representations and sets out specifications for mandatory label information such as the product's name, net quantity and dealer identity. It allows designated inspectors to: enter any place at any reasonable time; examine prepackaged products, open packages, examine and make copies of documents or papers; and seize products, labelling, packaging or advertising material which do not conform with the Act and Regulations. Conviction of an offense under the Act may result in up to a year in prison and a $10,000 fine.

The administration and enforcement of the Act and Regulations, as they relate to non‑food products, is the responsibility of the Competition Bureau, an agency of Industry Canada. Administration and enforcement of the Act and Regulations, as it relates to food products, is the responsibility of the Canadian Food Inspection Agency (CFIA). There are certain classes of items that are exempt from the CPLA, such as commercial, industrial, or institutional use only products or drugs or products for export only. The regulations govern the consistency, completeness, and accuracy of the labelling and packaging of consumer goods. These regulations create a uniform method for the labelling and packaging of consumer goods to assist consumers in making informed choices in the marketplace. A helpful Guide is available from the Federal government. The CPLA broadly defines "product" to mean any article that is, or may be, the subject of trade or commerce, including both food and non-food items. Textiles, on the other hand, fall under the Textile Labelling Act, and precious metals fall under the Precious Metals Marking Act.

History

The Act has undergone several major revisions throughout its time: in 2002-12-31, in 2011-11-29, in 2015-02-26.

In 2016, Two executives of Mucci International Marketing Inc. and Mucci Pac Ltd. and their companies were levied fines by the CFIA tribunal that totalled $1.5 million. Their offense was fraudulently to put "Product of Canada" labels on large quantities of peppers, tomatoes and cucumbers grown mainly in Mexico. The defendants supplied the mislabelled produce to Costco, to Loblaws and to Sobeys. The fraud at the Ontario Food Terminal was discovered in 2012, and investigators later executed in 2013 and 2014 three search warrants, which resulted in the seizure of more than 70 boxes of documents. A court in Windsor, Ontario heard the case. The agreed statement of facts quoted an email of a Mucci worker, that he was told "to make it Canada even though it is Mexico." The company, which was at the time located in Kingsville, Ontario, was also sentenced to probation for a three-year term.

In November 2017, a Maidstone, Ontario tomato processing company, that in addition had received a controversial $3-million provincial grant, was convicted of fraudulently mislabelling products as organic under the CAPA as well as other legislation. The owner and the company were also charged with falsifying the country of origin on their products between September 2013 and July 2015, passing off with labels that read "Product of Canada" produce that was American in origin. The owner was charged with lying to a federal food inspector on 8 January 2015. The case was heard in the Ontario Court of Justice. Separately, the company went bankrupt, owing more than a hundred creditors a total of over $25 million.

On 12 March 2018, a Leamington, Ontario greenhouse grower named AMCO Produce and its directors Fausto Amicone and Mark Wehby answered to charges brought by the CFIA for origin-of-vegetable fraud in a Windsor court. The corporation pleaded guilty to three charges under the Food and Drugs Act, the CPLA and the Canada Agricultural Products Act, and was fined $210,000. The individuals were let off in exchange for the guilty plea. The sentence included "intrusive" probation for a period of time under which the CFIA gains "unfettered" access to company records. The case began when the CFIA did in February 2013 a random inspection at the Ontario Food Terminal. Greenhouse peppers had been fraudulently mislabelled as Ontario produce at a time of year that was too cold for greenhouses to operate. The case covered offenses that occurred over a two-year span of time.

References

Canadian federal legislation
Canadian business law